The Capitals–Rangers rivalry is a National Hockey League (NHL) rivalry between the Washington Capitals and the New York Rangers. Both teams compete in the NHL's Eastern Conference's Metropolitan Division, and there is only a 230-mile drive between the cities of Washington, D.C. and New York. The rivalry gained traction in the 1990s but intensified from 2009 to 2015 with five head-to-head playoff series during that span.

1980s
With the League realigning to configure the new teams from the WHA, the Capitals were subsequently placed into the Patrick Division, the same division as the Rangers. However, the Capitals still struggled to make the playoffs finishing last in the division each year until 1983, where they finally made the playoffs for the first time in their history. The Rangers meanwhile were making the playoffs, but fell each year to the New York Islanders (except 1980). The Capitals, as well, lost to the Islanders each year until 1986.

During the 1986 playoffs, the two teams met for the first time in the playoffs. During the Patrick Division Final of these two rivals, the teams split the first four games before the Rangers took games five and six to win the series. The Ranger's season came to an end when they were defeated by the eventual Stanley Cup champion Montreal Canadiens in the Wales Conference Final in five games.

1990s
The teams met in the Patrick Division Final in 1990 with the Rangers winning the division title and beating their crosstown rival, the Islanders, in five games in the semifinal. The Capitals were coming off a 4–2 series win over the New Jersey Devils in the semifinal. Game one was taken by the Rangers by a score of 7–3 with a hat trick by Bernie Nicholls. The Capitals took game two by a score of 6–3, however they lost their star forward Dino Ciccarelli to a knee injury in the process. The Capitals then dominated the rest of the series winning game three 7–1 and game four 4–3 in overtime. John Druce would then score the series-winning goal in overtime in game five in New York to send the Capitals to the Conference Final against the Boston Bruins. However, the Presidents' Trophy-winning Bruins would sweep the Capitals in four straight.

The next year, the two met in the division semifinals. The Rangers took Games 1 and 3 2–1 and 6–0 respectively. The Capitals took the next three games to defeat the Rangers in six games, but the Capitals lost against the eventual Stanley Cup-winning Pittsburgh Penguins.

On December 26, 1991, the Rangers pulled off the greatest comeback in franchise history. After trailing the Capitals 6–1 near the end first period, the Rangers managed to score seven unanswered goals to win the game 8–6. In 1992, both teams made the playoffs with the top two regular season records, but both lost to the Pittsburgh Penguins who won another Stanley Cup that year.

In 1994, the two would meet for the last time until 2009. The Rangers won the Presidents' Trophy that year and swept the Islanders in the first round while the Capitals defeated the Penguins in six games. The Rangers took the first three games easily before the Capitals stayed alive by winning game four. The Rangers then took game five and became the eventual Stanley Cup champions, their first since 1940.

2000s
With the 1998 realignment moving the Capitals into the Southeast Division, and both teams struggling to make the playoffs until 2007, the rivalry died down. However, the emergence of Alexander Ovechkin for the Capitals has allowed his team to reenter the playoffs after a three-year drought.

In 2009, the two teams met for the first time in the playoffs since 1994. The Rangers took a 3–1 series lead in the conference quarterfinals after seeing the Capitals struggle in the first four games. However, the Capitals then dominated the rest of the series, outscoring the Rangers 11–4, and winning the series in 7. The Capitals faced the eventual Stanley Cup champion Pittsburgh Penguins again, losing this time in seven games.

2010s
In 2010, the Rangers did not make the playoffs but the Capitals, even though they won the Presidents' Trophy, in the first round gave up a 3–1 series lead to the Montreal Canadiens.

In 2011, the teams met in the first round, with the Rangers as the eighth seed and the Capitals first overall in the Eastern Conference. The Capitals would win the series in five games but would be swept in the next round by the Tampa Bay Lightning. Notably, the Capitals came back from a three-goal deficit in game 4 that would have otherwise tied the series.

In 2012, the teams met in the conference semifinals, with the Rangers being the first in the east and the Capitals as seventh. The Rangers had come off a hard-fought series against the Ottawa Senators while the Capitals had defeated the Stanley Cup-defending Bruins in seven games. The Rangers won every odd-numbered game in the series including a triple overtime win in game three, and a crucial game five where Capitals' Joel Ward took a double-minor penalty for high-sticking Rangers forward Carl Hagelin with 21.3 seconds remaining. The Rangers took full advantage of that double-minor with Brad Richards scoring the game-tying goal with 6.6 seconds remaining, and then carried the momentum and the second half of the double-minor into overtime as Marc Staal scored the game winner at 1:35 into the extra period. The Rangers would be defeated by their cross-river rivals, the New Jersey Devils.

In 2013, the Rangers and Capitals met in the first round. The home team won the first five games, thus allowing the Capitals to take a 3–2 series lead. However, the Rangers' goaltender Henrik Lundqvist shutout the Capitals in games six and seven to win the series.

In 2014, the conferences and divisions were realigned placing the Capitals back into the same division as the Rangers.

In 2015, the Rangers and Capitals met in second round of the playoffs after the Capitals missed the previous year. The Capitals stormed to a 3–1 series lead with help from their goaltender Braden Holtby limiting the Rangers to only four goals in the first four games. The Rangers would then mount a comeback in game 5 with Chris Kreider scoring the tying goal with only 1:41 remaining in regulation just as Henrik Lundqvist reached the bench for an extra attacker, and eventually won the game on an overtime goal by Ryan McDonagh to force the series back to Washington. After the loss in game six, Capitals' captain Alexander Ovechkin made a guarantee that his team would come back and win game seven similar to Mark Messier's guarantee about games six and seven with the Rangers against the Devils after trailing the series 3–2. In game seven, Ovechkin's guarantee seemed to be working as he scored the first goal of the game, however, Kevin Hayes would tie it in the second period. In overtime, Ovechkin's guarantee proved to be false as the Rangers' Derek Stepan scored to send his team to the conference final for the second year in a row while the Capitals gave up their fifth all-time 3–1 series lead, the most in the NHL. The Rangers would subsequently lose in the Eastern Conference Finals against the Tampa Bay Lightning in seven games.

2020s
The rivalry heated on May 3, 2021, when Capitals forward Tom Wilson punched Rangers forward Pavel Buchnevich for being aggressive toward his teammate, Vitek Vanecek. He also injured forward Artemi Panarin after a scrum. He was fined $5,000, the maximum allowable under the league's collective bargaining agreement (CBA). The Rangers later called George Parros, the head of the NHL Department of Player Safety, unfit to continue serving the role. Two days later, on May 5, a line brawl ensued after the actions of the game precedent. Six misconduct penalties (fighting majors) were placed in 4:14 of the first period. The night after the brawl, on May 6, the Rangers were fined $250,000 by the NHL.

See also
 National Hockey League rivalries
 Commanders-Giants rivalry (NFL)
 N.Y. Red Bulls–D.C. United rivalry (MLS)

References

Washington Capitals
New York Rangers
National Hockey League rivalries